DeFazio may refer to:

Brandon DeFazio (born 1988), Canadian ice hockeyer
Candy DeFazio (born 1950), United States lawn bowler
David DeFazio (born 1983), American-born ice dancer
Dean DeFazio (born 1963), Canadian ice hockey forward
Johnny DeFazio (1940–2021), American professional wrestler
Peter DeFazio (born 1947), representative from Oregon's 4th congressional district

See also
 Fazio (surname), list of people with a similar surname